The Flower of the Indies (French:La fleur des Indes) is a 1921 French silent film directed by Théo Bergerat and starring Huguette Duflos, André Baugé and Geo Leclercq.

Cast
 Huguette Duflos as Huguette  
 André Baugé as Jean de Mavel  
 Geo Leclercq as Docteur Fontanes  
 Haroutounian as Roucem

References

Bibliography
 Philippe Rège. Encyclopedia of French Film Directors, Volume 1. Scarecrow Press, 2009.

External links 
 

1921 films
French silent films
1920s French-language films
Films directed by Théo Bergerat
French black-and-white films
1920s French films